Hacıələkbərli (also, Gadzhyalekperli) is a village in the Gadabay Rayon of Azerbaijan.  The village forms part of the municipality of Dəyirmandağ.

References

External links

Populated places in Gadabay District